The Ethiopian Empire in exile was a government-in-exile formed when Emperor Haile Selassie fled the country after Italy invaded Ethiopia in 1935. Haile Selassie, recognized by Allied world powers as de jure legitimate ruler of Ethiopia, went to Jerusalem via Djibouti by boarding British ship in 1936. 

He then went to a villa Fairfield House in Bath, England accompanied by his children, grandchildren and servants, and spent the reminder time until the liberation of Ethiopia during East African Campaign in 1941, where he returned to the throne after leaving for five years. Haile Selassie also went to Geneva to address League of Nations about the Ethiopian sovereignty and denouncing Italy's actions toward his army on 30 June 1936.

Initial journey
The government of Ethiopia in-exile was occurred when Emperor Haile Selassie fled to Bath (145km west of London) in 1935 as Benito Mussolini declared the invasion of Ethiopian Empire on 9 May 1936.  

On 1 May 1936, Haile Selassie took a train to Djibouti and then boarded a British ship.

In Jerusalem

Jerusalem was a sanctuary to the emperor and the Royal family in his exile during the Italian invasion of Ethiopia. This was the second visit of the city in the twentieth century, one in 1924 grand tour of Europe. While at Jerusalem, Haile Selassie spend majority times with Ethiopian monks, praying with them at the Church of the Holy Sepulcher.

In England

Emperor Haile Selassie fled to Bath (145km west of London) where he granted by British authority to live as asylum. However, they do not want to stay in London as long as possible due to perceived "politically embarrassing". Upon arrival, he stayed at a hotel. Shortly afterward, he bought Fairfield House to spend the remainder of his time. He was accompanied by his children, grandchildren, servants and others. In Bath, Haile Selassie accustomed to the "army of servants" and living in single house as financially restricted. He was seen getting rid of jewelry on a couple of occasions. Upon leaving England, he left the house for the elderly. In 1954, Haile Selassie visited Bath again.  

An estimated 90,000 people of Ethiopian descent lived Britain, among them were Abiyot Desta, who visited the residence of the emperor for the first time.

In Geneva
On 30 June 1936, Haile Selassie traveled once to Geneva to plead with the League of Nations that Ethiopia not be officially recognized as part of Italian Empire.  He had also European allies who traveled to Ethiopia to report the news about Ethiopian army struggling with Italy.  

The report helped the British to enter Ethiopia with the emperor in the later years. As Italy declared war on England in 1940, the British accompanied Haile Selassie to Sudan and helped him organizing his army within seven months, and finally accomplished it by liberating Ethiopia and return to the throne on 5 May 1941.

References

Haile Selassie
20th century in Ethiopia
Second Italo-Ethiopian War
Italian East Africa
Ethiopian Empire
History of Ethiopia